Batang Kali is a town and mukim in Hulu Selangor District, Selangor, Malaysia. The city is designated as a transit point to Genting Highlands, a renowned resort city. Originally just a small town gaining traction due to the development of Ligamas, Batang Kali is now quickly emerging as one of the fastest-growing suburb in Hulu Selangor District.

History 

The downtown of Batang Kali, Bandar Utama Batang Kali is primarily a planned city, developed on what originally is an oil palm plantations by Ligamas, Ltd. After the initial development by Ligamas in the early 2000, Batang Kali quickly took off with many new inhabitants moving into the town. From time to time, more investors and developers lay their foundation in the town.

Geography 
Batang Kali is a name for both a mukim and the city. The mukim has a total area of -. Nearby mukims are Ulu Yam and Rasa mukims.

The location of Batang Kali being at the base of Titiwangsa Mountains and near the major resort city Genting Highlands, made it an attractive location to tourists all around the country. Many recreational parks and holiday resorts have been opened all around it, especially along the route connecting Batang Kali and Genting Highlands.

Bandar Utama Batang Kali 

Batang Kali's biggest development that thus denotes as the downtown of the city, Bandar Utama Batang Kali, is where all the businesses reside. Bandar Utama Batang Kali is situated at the core of the city with shopping, restaurants and residential services. Bandar Utama Batang Kali is steadily expanding with new sections being added as new developments are being constructed, such as the Pusat Perdagangan Ara. As of 2023, many businesses are present in and around Batang Kali, among them are the following:

Fast-food chains

KFC
Subway
Marrybrown
Pizza Hut
Domino's Pizza
KungFu Sushi

Cafes

Secret Recipe
Baker's Cottage
Richiamo Coffee
Wakaka F&B
Mykōri
Tealive
Coolblog
Mammabunz
Costa Coffee
Bean with Me
ZUS Coffee
Bask Bear Coffee

Retailers

FamilyMart
CU Mart
emart24
99 Speedmart
KK Supermart
7-Eleven
Guardian
Watsons
MR. DIY
HappyHome 
Eco-Shop
Setia
Pasaraya Yang Yang
Pasaraya Penko
Pasaraya MM
SWC Enterprise
Al-Ikhsan Sports (coming soon)

Transportation

Rail services

Batang Kali is connected to KTM Port Klang line by Batang Kali Station.

Major roads
Federal Route 1

Notable events
The Batang Kali massacre occurred at this location on 12 December 1948 during the period of the Malayan Emergency.

On 16 December 2022, a landslide hit campsites in Father's Organic Farm at Jalan Genting (Selangor State Route ) near the town, killing 31 people, 8 of them are children.

Education
Schools within the township boundary of Batang Kali include:

Elementary:
Sekolah Kebangsaan Kampung Kuantan
Sekolah Kebangsaan Batang Kali
Sekolah Kebangsaan Bandar Baru Batang Kali
Sekolah Jenis Kebangsaan (Tamil) Ladang Batang Kali
Sekolah Jenis Kebangsaan (Cina) Kampung Gurney
Sekolah Jenis Kebangsaan (Cina) Choong Chee
Sekolah Jenis Kebangsaan (Cina) Batang Kali
Sekolah Rendah Agama Batang Kali

Secondary:
Sekolah Menengah Kebangsaan Syed Mashor
Sekolah Menengah Kebangsaan Bandar Baru Batang Kali

Hulu Selangor District
Towns in Selangor